Martha Virginia Worst (later Smith, January 23, 1911 – December 9, 1981) was an American javelin thrower. In 1936 she won the national AAU title and placed ninth at the Berlin Olympics.

References

External links 
 

American female javelin throwers
1911 births
1981 deaths
Track and field athletes from Chicago
Olympic track and field athletes of the United States
Athletes (track and field) at the 1936 Summer Olympics
20th-century American women